Villasexmir is a municipality in the province of Valladolid, Castile and León, Spain.  (INE), it had 103 inhabitants.

References

Municipalities in the Province of Valladolid